The Hunter is a 2011 Australian drama film, directed by Daniel Nettheim and produced by Vincent Sheehan, based on the 1999 novel of the same name by Julia Leigh. It stars Willem Dafoe, Sam Neill and Frances O'Connor. Dafoe flew to Tasmania for the film's premiere at the State Cinema in North Hobart.

In the film, a shadowy corporation ("Red Leaf") sends mercenary Martin David (Dafoe) to Tasmania to track down a thylacine, a supposedly extinct animal whose genetic code holds the secret to a dangerous weapon. The film opened to the Australian public in cinemas on 29 September 2011.

Plot
Mercenary Martin David is hired by military biotech company, Red Leaf, to go to Tasmania and gather samples of a supposedly extinct marsupial, the thylacine (Tasmanian tiger), with further instructions to kill all remaining tigers to ensure no competing organisation will get their DNA.

Posing as a university biologist, Martin lodges in the home of the Armstrong family: Lucy and her two young children, Katie and Jamie. Lucy is perpetually benumbed from prescribed medication, taken after the disappearance of her environmentalist husband, Jarrah Armstrong. Speculation surrounds Jarrah's disappearance, particularly with regards to a longstanding conflict between the local loggers who are in desperate need of jobs, and the 'greenies', a group of environmentalists who have set up road blocks to the forest to prevent its deforestation. Martin goes into the bush for twelve days at a time, setting up various steel traps and makeshift snares, while waiting patiently to see if a tiger will surface. During his short stays at the Armstrongs' to resupply, Martin slowly befriends the children, and discovers that Lucy's medication is delivered to her by Jack Mindy, who has been unofficially looking in on the family. Martin confiscates Lucy's medication, and bathes her while she is unconscious, after realising the detrimental effects of her dependency.

During one return from the bush, Martin finds Lucy has recovered from the symptoms of her addiction. Jamie provides Martin with a clue as to the tiger's whereabouts: a drawing of the tiger near trees and small bodies of water. From the drawing, Martin is able to deduce the tiger's location on his map. On his next trip out, Martin stumbles across Jarrah's skeletal remains and discovers that he had been shot through the head. Martin gives him a proper burial, but does not reveal his findings to the Armstrong family. On his return to the Armstrong house, Lucy informs him that Red Leaf had initially contracted Jarrah to locate the tiger, a pursuit he eventually abandoned in favour of taking up an environmental cause to protect wildlife and that Red Leaf wanted Jarrah to find the tiger because they believed that it had a paralysing venom in its bite.

While hiking to check his traps, Martin is ambushed by a rival Red Leaf operative sent to replace him. The man binds Martin's hands and instructs Martin to lead him to the tiger's cave, but Martin instead leads the operative past one of his steel traps. The operative steps on the trap, and its metal teeth bind his leg. The operative drops both rifles. Martin frees his hands, picks up one of the rifles, and kills the operative just as the operative frees himself from the trap and lunges for the other rifle. Martin returns to the Armstrong residence to find it burnt down. Confronting Mindy, he learns that Lucy and Katie had perished in the fire that Mindy claims broke out by accident, but Jamie survived and was taken by the authorities. Martin sets out into the bush once more to find the Tasmanian tiger and put an end to Red Leaf's pursuit. He finally finds the creature and reluctantly shoots it, then proceeds to cremate it in order to remove all traces of its existence.

Martin returns to town and calls Red Leaf, informing them that what they are looking for is "gone forever". He then goes to a school where Jamie sits alone on a bench. When Jamie sees Martin, he runs excitedly toward him and the two embrace.

Cast

Filming locations 
The movie was filmed entirely in Tasmania, locations include:

 Central Plateau
 Hobart International Airport, Cambridge
 Hotel Grand Chancellor foyer, Hobart (as Paris airport hotel)
 Lenna of Hobart, Battery Point (as Paris hotel room)
 National Park Hotel, Mount Field National Park
 Moonah Primary School, Moonah
 Mount Wellington
 Upper Florentine Valley
 Westerway General Store, Westerway

Critical reception
The film received generally favourable reviews from critics. On Rotten Tomatoes holds a 72% rating based on 90 reviews, with an average rating of 6.54/10. The site's critical consensus states that "The Hunter occasionally suffers from predictability, but Willem Dafoe gives a terrific performance as an obsessive hunter on the trail of a mysterious beast." On Metacritic, the film holds a score of 63 out of 100, based on reviews from 15 critics. 
Kim Newman from Empire gave the film three stars, calling The Hunter "a slow-burning, beautifully shot, and highly understated philosophical thriller".

Accolades

See also
 The Tiger: An Old Hunter's Tale

Notes

References

External links 
  – official site
 
 

2011 films
2010s psychological drama films
2011 psychological thriller films
2010s adventure drama films
Australian adventure drama films
2010s English-language films
Films about families
Films based on Australian novels
Films about hunters
Films set in jungles
Films set in Tasmania
Films shot in Tasmania
Hunting in Australia
2011 drama films